Thackeray Hall is an academic building of the University of Pittsburgh and a contributing property to the Schenley Farms National Historic District[] at 139 University Place on the campus of the University of Pittsburgh in Pittsburgh, Pennsylvania, United States.

Thackeray Hall houses Pitt's Department of Mathematics. Previously, it housed the Mathematics Library in room 430, whose collection is now located in the Bevier Engineering Library of Benedum Hall. On the ground floor are many university student services: class registration, tuition billing, and transcripts, as well as housing the Advising Center of the School of Arts and Sciences on the second floor.

The building is the former National Union Fire Insurance Company building built circa 1923–1925 in the Early Classical style.  The building was purchased by the university in 1968 for $1.875 million ($ in  dollars), and was originally purposed for faculty offices.  It was known as the Social Sciences Building until 1972 when it was renamed Mervis Hall and designated as the home of the Graduate School of Business. In 1983, when the Graduate School of Business moved into a new building also named Mervis Hall, it was renamed Thackeray Hall.

References

External links
 Thackeray Hall on Pitt's virtual Campus Tour
 Department of Mathematics
 School of Arts & Sciences Advising

University of Pittsburgh academic buildings
Historic district contributing properties in Pennsylvania
National Register of Historic Places in Pittsburgh
University and college buildings on the National Register of Historic Places in Pennsylvania